Araeopterella is a monotypic moth genus of the family Noctuidae. Its only species, Araeopterella miscidisce, is found in Panama. Both the genus and species were first described by Harrison Gray Dyar Jr. in 1914.

Araeopterella Fibiger & Hacker, 2001 is also a synonym of Araeopteron Hampson, 1893 and Araeopterella sterrhaoides Fibiger & Hacker, 2001 is now called Araeopteron sterrhaoides (Fibiger & Hacker, 2001).

References

 Fibiger, M. & Hacker, H. H. (2001). Esperiana Buchreie zur Entomologie. 8: 1–944.
 Fibiger, M. & Kononenko, V. (2008). Zootaxa. 1891: 39–54.

Acontiinae